The Boa Vista Super Cup, also known as Bubista Cup under the Boa Vista Creole name (ALUPEK: Taça da Dja da Boa Bista or Bubista) is a regional super cup competition played during the season in Boa Vista Island, Cape Verde. The super cup competition is organized by the Boa Vista Regional Football Association (Associação Regional da Boa Vista de Futebol, ARBVF).  Its current winner is Académica Operária who won their second super cup title.

The competition first took place in 2010.  Until 2015, no club qualified as runner-up into the super cup and were the two in the nation (the other was São Nicolau).

Second straight time that the Boa Vista derby will appear in the upcoming 2018 super cup with Académica Operária and Sal Rei. With Sal Rei being both champions and cup winner for the season, Académica Operária will qualify as runner up in the cup final.

Winners

1Runner-up in the cup competition as the season's champion was also a cup winner
1Onze Estrelas was awarded 0-3, originally it was 2-1 as Sal Rei fielded an ineligible player

See also
Boa Vista Island Cup
Boa Vista Island League
Boa Vista Opening Tournament

Notes

References

Sport in Boa Vista, Cape Verde
Football cup competitions in Cape Verde
Recurring sporting events established in 2010
2010 establishments in Cape Verde